"Who's Got Your Love" is a song that was co-produced, co-written and recorded by the American electronic trio Cheat Codes, featuring American electronic DJ/singer Daniel Blume. The second release off Cheat Codes' second EP Level 2, the electropop/dance track became their first number one on the Billboard Dance/Mix Show Airplay chart in August 2019.

Track listing
Single 
Who's Got Your Love  - 2:37

References

2019 singles
2019 songs
Cheat Codes (DJs) songs
Dance-pop songs
Electropop songs
House music songs
Songs about heartache
Songs about loneliness